Raymond Emmanuel Woog (25 October 1875, Paris - 10 May 1949, Neuilly-sur-Seine) was a French painter, designer and illustrator.

Biography 
He was a student of Gustave Moreau at the École des Beaux-Arts. In 1903, he was one of the exhibitors at the first Salon d'Automne, where he received critical praise from Arsène Alexandre. Two years later, he married Violette Julie Picard (1882-1968), whose father was a businessman. They had four daughters.

This was interrupted in 1914, at the beginning of World War I. The following year, he was inducted, and spent six months in Flanders. Upon being promoted to Lieutenant, he was posted as an attaché to the British Army. His sketches of English and French soldiers were published in 1916, as 32 plates in a canvas portfolio. It was a limited edition of 150 copies, with the title "Passed by Censor". He was mustered out early in 1918.

He began his career as an illustrator with a cover for the novel, by André Maurois, who also served with British troops during the war. Woog is said to have been the inspiration for the novel's narrator, "Aurelle", a French interpreter. This served as his entry into the milieu of the press, where he became a good friend of the journalist, . He would soon be a recognized illustrator for several publications.

In 1928, he travelled to New York, for an exhibition of his works at the Jacques Seligmann gallery. Curiously, his reputation in the United States appears to have been based on his portraits of children. He did, in fact, perform several such commissions while there, but also painted portraits of notable people, such as Maurice Ravel. From 1933 to 1934, he was a regular collaborator with Les Nouvelles littéraires.

He made many long stays in Seine-et-Marne, where he specialized in painting flowers; a theme he would return to when he retired in 1940 and settled in Crest. He was named a Knight in the Legion of Honor in 1947.

Selected paintings

References

Further reading 
 Anatole Le Braz, Raymond Woog, Paris, Éditions Galerie Georges Petit, 1913.
 Noël Clément-Janin, Les estampes, images et affiches de la guerre, Paris, Éditions Gazette des beaux-arts, 1919.
 André Maurois, Raymond Woog, New York, Éditions Galerie Jacques Seligmann, 1928.
 Jean Oudin, Raymond Woog, Éditions de la Société nationale des beaux-arts, 1960.

External links 

 More works by Woog @ Invaluable

1875 births
1949 deaths
19th-century French painters
French illustrators
French portrait painters
Recipients of the Legion of Honour
Artists from Paris
20th-century French painters